The Popular Movement of the Revolution (abbr. MPR) was the ruling political party in Zaire (known for part of its existence as the Democratic Republic of the Congo). For most of its existence, it was the only legally permitted party in the country. It was founded by Joseph-Désiré Mobutu (later Mobutu Sese Seko) on 20 May 1967.

Ideology
The official ideology of the MPR, as laid down in the Manifesto of N'sele in May 1967, incorporated "nationalism", "revolution", and "authenticity". Revolution was described as a "truly national revolution, essentially pragmatic," which called for "the repudiation of both capitalism and communism." One of the MPR's slogans was "Neither left nor right," to which would be added "nor even centre" in later years. Nevertheless, historians consider Mobutu's regime to be Right-Wing and there is evidence of economic liberalization during Mobutu's rule as he appointed Léon Kengo wa Dondo, a prominent advocate of free market reform, as prime minister. Some historians, such as Michel Ugarte and Max Liniger-Goumaz, argue that Mobutu's Zaire was part of a phenomenon called "tropical fascism" due to its authoritarianism, anti-communism, and Third-Positionist rhetoric.

One-party period

From its formation in 1967 to 1990, the MPR was de facto the only legal party in the country.  The 1967 constitution explicitly allowed the existence of two parties. However, the MPR was the only party allowed to nominate candidates in presidential and parliamentary elections held in November 1970.  A month later, on 23 December, the constitution was amended to formally declare the MPR to be the only legally permitted party.

The 1974 constitution enshrined the MPR's status as the vanguard of the nation.  It stated that "there exists a single institution, the MPR, incarnated by its President," that the "President of the MPR is ex officio President of the Republic, and holds the plenitude of power exercise," and that "Mobutism" was constitutional doctrine.  All citizens of Zaire became members of the MPR at birth.  In effect, the government was a transmission belt for the MPR.

The MPR elected its president every seven years at its national convention (five years before 1978). At that time, the MPR's president was automatically nominated as the sole candidate for a seven-year term as president of the republic; he was confirmed in office by a national referendum. Mobutu was elected unopposed as president three times under this system, with official figures showing an implausible 98 percent or more of voters approving his candidacy against at most 1.8 percent either voting "no," casting blank ballots or spoiling their ballot papers.  Every five years, a single list of MPR candidates was returned to the legislature, with unanimous or near-unanimous support. All of these candidates were effectively handpicked by Mobutu.

In 1975, formal elections were dispensed with altogether. Instead, the MPR list was approved by acclamation; candidates were simply brought out at stadiums and other public places and cheered by the audiences.

For all intents and purposes, the MPR and the government were one. This effectively gave Mobutu complete political control over the country.

Multi-party period

The single-party system lasted until 24 April 1990, the date of the proclamation of the Third Republic. On that date, Mobutu said that three political parties would be allowed.  The "moderate" and "hardline" factions of the MPR would form separate parties, while the third party would be the Union for Democracy and Social Progress (UDPS). Under the new multiparty system, Mobutu said that he would be above political parties, and accordingly he resigned as the president of the MPR on the same date, although he again accepted the post of party president a year later, on 21 April 1991.

The party had no real ideology other than support for Mobutu.  As such, it disappeared in short order when Mobutu was overthrown by Laurent-Désiré Kabila in 1997, during the First Congo War. Nzanga Mobutu, the son of Mobutu Sese Seko, is the chairman of the Union of Mobutuist Democrats (UDEMO), a Mobutist political party in parliament.

Electoral history

Presidential elections

Parliamentary elections

References

1960s establishments in the Republic of the Congo (Léopoldville)
1967 establishments in Africa
1997 disestablishments in Zaire
African and Black nationalist parties in Africa
Anti-communist parties
Congolese nationalism (Democratic Republic of the Congo)
Defunct political parties in the Democratic Republic of the Congo
Mobutu Sese Seko
Parties of one-party systems
Political parties disestablished in 1997
Political parties established in 1967
Syncretic political movements
Third Position
Zaire